The Russian ironclad Petropavlovsk was a 22-gun armored frigate in the Imperial Russian Navy during the late 19th century.  She was originally ordered as a 58-gun wooden frigate, but she was reordered as an ironclad while under construction and subsequently converted into one. She served as the flagship of the Baltic Fleet during the 1860s and 1870s. The ship was decommissioned in 1885, but was not sold for scrap until 1892.

Description
She displaced  and was fitted with a blunt iron ram at her bow. Petropavlovsk was considered to be seaworthy; her total crew numbered 680 officers and enlisted men.

The ship was fitted with a horizontal return-connecting-rod steam engine built by the Baird Works of Saint Petersburg. It drove a single four-bladed propeller using steam that was provided by an unknown number of rectangular boilers. She was ship rigged with three masts.

As a heavy frigate, Petropavlovsk was intended to be armed with 54 of the most powerful guns available to the Russians, the  60-pounder smoothbore gun, and four long 36-pounder smoothbores. Her armament was revised when she was converted to an ironclad and she was completed with an armament of twenty  rifled guns and two 60-pounder guns; all of the 8-inch guns were located on the lower deck and the 60-pounders were mounted on the upper deck as chase guns. Later another pair of 60-pounder guns were added on the upper deck. In 1877, the armament on her upper deck was changed and consisted of one 8-inch, one  and ten  rifled guns.

Construction and service
Petropavlovsk, named for the siege of Petropavlovsk during the Crimean War, was laid down on 12 January 1861 as a 58-gun heavy frigate at the New Admiralty Shipyard in Saint Petersburg. She was reordered as (converted into) a 22-gun armored frigate on 29 October 1861 while still under construction. The ship was launched on 15 August 1865 and commissioned on 1 August 1867. During the 1860s and 1870s, Petropavlovsk served as the flagship of the Baltic Fleet. Petropavlovsk rescued some of the survivors. On 13 September 1871, she collided with the Russian merchant ship Damrowsky off Reval, damaging the merchantman's rigging. Also in September, she collided with the British merchant ship Ecliptic. She was decommissioned on 15 June 1885, stricken from the Navy List on 4 January 1892 and subsequently sold for scrap.

Notes

Footnotes

References

 

Naval ships of Russia
Ironclad warships of the Imperial Russian Navy
1865 ships
Ships built at Admiralty Shipyard